Reineldis (also Reinhild, Reinaldes, Rainelde among others; c. 630 – c. 700) was a saint of the 7th century, martyred by the Huns.

Life
Reineldis was born in a place called Condacum (which is identified with either Condé-sur-l'Escaut or Kontich). She was the daughter of Duke Witger of Lotharingia and Saint Amalberga of Maubeuge. Her brother Emebert was a priest in the diocese of Cambrai. Her biography mentions Gudula as her sister. Her mother entered the religious life at Maubeuge Abbey.

Reineldis made a pilgrimage to the Holy Land. Her vita, written between 1048 and 1051 in Lobbes Abbey,
records this fact, stating that she visited Jerusalem.

She returned home and devoted herself to a life of charitable work at Saintes. She was decapitated by the Huns at Saintes, together with deacon Grimoaldus and her servant Gondulphus.

Veneration
Saint Reineldis is primarily venerated in Saintes as the patron saint of the town. Some sources even indicate that Saintes owes its name to Reineldis' martyrdom.

The parish church of Saintes is dedicated to Sainte-Renelde since the Middle Ages and has preserved the relics of Saint Reineldis. This church has a large bell tower built in the 17th century.

Saint Reineldis' patronage for eye diseases is due to the association with a water well in Saintes known as "Sainte Renelde's well", water which is believed to cure eye diseases.

Iconography
Reineldis is commonly depicted with a sword or being dragged by her hair, referring to the decapitation. She is also portrayed as a pilgrim, because of her journey to the Holy Land.

Gallery

Notes

External links
 Den hellige Reineldis
 Pictures of Saintes, Belgium - includes both the church (eglise) and well (puits) of Saint Reineldis
Catholic Online entry for Reineldis

Belgian Roman Catholic saints
7th-century Frankish women
630 births
700 deaths
7th-century Frankish saints
Christian female saints of the Middle Ages
Colombanian saints